Tong Akeen Ngor is a South Sudanese governor of the state of Northern Bahr el Ghazal. He was appointed by President Kiir in February 2020 as one of revitalized-peace agreement's governors.

Activist imprisonment
 
A court in Aweil sentenced an activist, Samuel Garang Dut, to eight months in prison for making false statements against Northern Bahr el Ghazal State governor.

Garang Mangok, the presiding judge, found Samuel Garang Dut guilty of libel and slander.

He was also ordered to pay a fine of two million South Sudanese Pounds to Tong Aken.

Garang was ordered to court by Governor Tong after the activist took pictures of a modern building constructed in Juba and claimed it belonged to Governor Aken.

References

Living people
1965 births
South Sudanese politicians